Barij Essence Kashan Volleyball Club was an Iranian professional volleyball team based in Kashan, Iran. They competed in the Iranian Volleyball Super League.

Notable former players 
  Rodrigo Santana
  Mehdi Mahdavi
  Alireza Nadi
  Amir Ghafour
  Farhad Ghaemi
  Armin Tashakkori

References 

 Rosters

External links
 Official website

Iranian volleyball clubs
Sport in Isfahan